Mieketine Wouters (born 10 March 1969) is a Dutch field hockey player. She competed in the women's tournament at the 1992 Summer Olympics.

References

External links
 

1969 births
Living people
Dutch female field hockey players
Olympic field hockey players of the Netherlands
Field hockey players at the 1992 Summer Olympics
Sportspeople from Tilburg